Eleni Memetzi (born ) is a Greek female volleyball player. She was part of the Greece women's national volleyball team.

She competed with the national team at the 2004 Summer Olympics in Athens, Greece. She played with Vrilissia in 2004.

Clubs
  FO Vrilissia (2004)

See also
 Greece at the 2004 Summer Olympics

References

External links
Eleni Memetzi at Sports Reference
http://www.cev.lu/Competition-Area/PlayerDetails.aspx?TeamID=633&PlayerID=19450&ID=44
http://usatoday30.usatoday.com/sports/olympics/athens/results.aspx?rsc=VOW400A06
http://www.todor66.com/volleyball/Olympics/Women_2004.html
https://www.youtube.com/watch?v=HiDf79B2pZY

1975 births
Living people
Greek women's volleyball players
Place of birth missing (living people)
Volleyball players at the 2004 Summer Olympics
Olympic volleyball players of Greece
Volleyball players from Orestiada
21st-century Greek women